is a geotechnical engineering professor at the University of Tokyo, Japan. Currently, he is the chief editor of "Soils and Foundations," a civil engineering journal. His research work is mainly in the areas of liquefaction of soil during earthquakes.

External links
 
 https://web.archive.org/web/20130825092530/http://geotle.t.u-tokyo.ac.jp/member/towhata/index-english.htm

Japanese educators
Living people
Year of birth missing (living people)